Mark Murdock, Jr is a former American football quarterback. He was the starting quarterback of the Texas Longhorns in 1988-89. He set several records for a freshman quarterback at Texas in 1988.

High school
Murdock played football at Westwood High School in Round Rock just outside Austin. He led the team to an 8-2 record and was a top 30 recruit for the state of Texas in 1987 after throwing for 1,800 yards and 22 touchdowns.

Longhorn career

After redshirting his freshman year in 1987, Murdock shared playing time with senior Shannon Kelley in 1988. He replaced Kelley in wins over New Mexico and North Texas early in the season. In the 6th game of the season, after replacing Kelley, Murdock rallied Texas from a 24-3 third quarter deficit throwing 2 touchdown passes to bring Texas to within striking range, but the Razorbacks held on to preserve a 27-24 win. Nonetheless, Murdock played well enough to earn the starting job for the rest of the season. In his first start against Texas Tech in Lubbock, Murdock threw for 326 yards and two touchdowns in a 33-32 loss. In the final game of the season against Texas A&M, Murdock again rallied the team from behind. Trailing 28-0 in the 2nd quarter, Murdock threw 3 touchdowns and led the team to within 4 points before time expired. Nonetheless, Murdock played well enough to set freshman records at Texas for single-season passing touchdowns, single game passing touchdowns and single-season passing yards and being named to The Sporting News Freshman All American team.

In 1989, Murdock came into the season as a starter with a new Offensive Coordinator, Lynn Amadee.  Texas started off the season against a difficult schedule.  First, in Boulder against national title contender Colorado and then Penn State in Austin. After a 1-2 start, he was replaced by redshirt freshman Peter Gardere.

In 1990, he played in 4 games.

Records
UT-Passing by a freshman, game (326), surpassed by Shea Morenz in 1993
UT-Passing by a freshman, season (1,189), surpassed by Peter Gardere in 1989
UT-Touchdown passes by a freshman, season (10), surpassed by Morenz in 1993
UT-Longest pass play by a freshman (76 yards), broke own record, surpassed by Major Applewhite in 1998

Life After Football
Murdock obtained his degree from the University of Texas in the Plan II Honors Program in 1991.  He is currently an investor in Houston, TX.  Murdock is married to the former Jenny Turner who was an individual and team SWC Champion golfer at The University of Texas and also played on the LPGA tour.  Jenny is now the Varsity Golf Coach at Second Baptist School in Houston, TX.   Mark and Jenny have three children, Mark, Drew, and Turner.

References

External links 
Career Statistics
1989 Yearbook Profile
Action photo
Program photo
High School Statistics

Living people
American football quarterbacks
Texas Longhorns football players
People from Round Rock, Texas
Players of American football from Texas
Year of birth missing (living people)